In the theory of lattices, the dual lattice is a construction analogous to that of a dual vector space.

Dual lattices have many applications inside of lattice theory, theoretical computer science, cryptography and mathematics more broadly. For instance, it is used in the statement of the Poisson summation formula, transference theorems provide connections between the geometry of a lattice and that of its dual, and many lattice algorithms exploit the dual lattice.

For an article with emphasis on the physics / chemistry applications, see Reciprocal lattice. This article focuses on the mathematical notion of a dual lattice.

Definition

Let  be a lattice. That is,  for some matrix .

Despite this identification of ambient Euclidean spaces, it should be emphasized that a lattice and its dual are fundamentally different kinds of objects; one consists of vectors in Euclidean space, and the other consists of a set of linear functionals on that space. Along these lines, one can also give a more abstract definition as follows:

One of the key uses of duality in lattice theory is the relationship of the geometry of the primal lattice with the geometry of its dual, for which we need this inner product. In the concrete description given above, the inner product on the dual is generally implicit.

Properties

We list some elementary properties of the dual lattice:
 If  is a matrix giving a basis for the lattice , then   satisfies .
 If  is a matrix giving a basis for the lattice , then  gives a basis for the dual lattice. If  is full rank  gives a basis for the dual lattice: .
 The previous fact shows that . This equality holds under the usual identifications of a vector space with its double dual, or in the setting where the inner product has identified  with its dual.
 Fix two lattices  . Then  if and only if .
 The determinant of a lattice is the reciprocal of the determinant of its dual: 
 If  is a nonzero scalar, then .
 If  is a rotation matrix, then .
 A lattice  is said to be integral if  for all . Assume that the lattice  is full rank. Under the identification of Euclidean space with its dual, we have that  for integral lattices . From this it follows that for an integral lattice,  .
 An integral lattice is said to be unimodular if  , which, by the above, is equivalent to

Examples

Using the properties listed above, the dual of a lattice can be efficiently calculated, by hand or computer. Certain lattices with importance in mathematics and computer science are dual to each other, and we list some here.

Elementary examples

 Let  be the lattice of integer vectors whose coordinates have an even sum. Then  , that is, the dual is the lattice generated by the integer vectors along with the all  s vector.

q-ary lattices

An important class of examples, particularly in lattice cryptography, are given by the q-ary lattices. Then, after identifying Euclidean space with its dual, we have that the image and kernel q-ary lattices of a matrix  are dual, up to a scalar. (The proof can be done as an exercise.)

Transference theorems

Each  partitions  according to the level sets corresponding to each of the integer values. In general, theorems relating the properties of a lattice with properties of its dual are known as transference theorems. In this section we explain some of them, along with some consequences for complexity theory.

In this notation, the lower bound mentioned in the introduction to this section states that .

There always an efficiently checkable certificate for the claim that a lattice has a short nonzero vector, namely the vector itself. An important corollary of Banaszcyk's transference theorem is that , which implies that to prove that a lattice has no short vectors, one can show a basis for the dual lattice consisting of short vectors.

Other transference theorems:

Poisson summation formula

The dual lattice is used in the statement of a general Poisson summation formula.

Further reading

References

Lattice theory